Fritz T. Epstein was a scholar and expert on the Soviet Union, born in Sarreguemines, Alsace-Lorraine, then part of the German Empire, in 1898. He emigrated to the United States in the mid-1930s, and after an illustrious career, died in 1979. He was married to a Bertelsmann, by whom he had two children.

Life
Epstein was the son of mathematician Paul Epstein and Alice Betty (née Wiesengrund). On his mother's side he was thus related to Theodor Adorno, since Alice Betty was Adorno's aunt. He graduated to Heidelberg University where his studies were interrupted by the outbreak of World War I. He served in a sound-direction-finding unit (Schallmesstrupp)on the Western Front, and took part in   General Ludendorff's Kaiserschlacht or final offensive in 1918.

At war's end he renewed his studies, focusing on Eastern European history successively at Jena, Frankfurt am Main and Berlin, where he received his PhD, with a dissertation on the court and administration of Russia from the 15th to the 17th century, in 1924. He undertook his Habilitationsschrift at the University of Hamburg, under Richard Salomon, from 1926 to 1931, and Frankfurt University from 1932 to 1933, on the International Relations of the Soviet Union and the Allied Intervention in the post-revolutionary period of civil war of 1917-1921.

With the Nazi seizure of power in 1933, his Habilitation and any prospect of a career was blocked and he thus moved to London in 1933,  to escape Nazi persecution, with the assistance of the Academic Assistance Council (AAC), and subsequently to the United States (1936). He was appointed to the faculty of Harvard University in 1937, and taught there until 1943. During the war he was engaged to work for the U.S. State Department. From 1948 to 1951 he worked as Curator of the Central European and Slavic Collections at the Hoover Institution Library and Archives, Stanford University.

In 1962, he joined the faculty of Indiana University as professor and curator of the Slavic collections. Epstein retired in 1969 and returned to Germany to live. He died on December 6, 1979

Works
(editor) Heinrich von Staden, Aufzeichnungen ueber den Moskauer Staat, Friedrichsen, Hamburg 1930, 2nd., ed. 1964
Fritz T.Epstein, War-Time Activities of the SS-Ahnenerbe in Baron Max Beloff, (ed.) On the track of tyranny: essays presented by the Wiener Library to Leonard G. Montefiore, on the occasion of his seventieth birthday, Ayer Publishing, 1960 pp.77-95.

Stefan Müller-Doohm,Adorno: a biography,'' (tr. Rodney Livingstone), Polity, 2005.
G. L. Weinberg, 'Note: Fritz T.Epstein, 1898–1979,'  Conference Group for Central European History of the American Historical Association. pp. 399ff.

1898 births
1979 deaths
People from Sarreguemines
People from Alsace-Lorraine
Alsatian Jews
Jewish emigrants from Nazi Germany to the United States
Jewish American historians
American male non-fiction writers
Harvard University faculty
Heidelberg University alumni
20th-century American male writers
Indiana University faculty